Jhihben National Forest Recreation Area is located in Beinan Township, Taitung County, Taiwan.

Geography
The forest recreation area spans around 110 hectares in area with an elevation of 125 to 650 meters above sea level. The park has an annual mean temperature of around 22 °C.

Architecture
The forest features various walking trails and recreational facilities.

Transportation
The recreation area is accessible by bus from Taitung City.

See also
 Geography of Taiwan

References

External links

 知本國家森林遊樂區 

Geography of Taitung County
National forest recreation areas in Taiwan
Tourist attractions in Taitung County